The Mu'allaq Mosque is a mosque in Tripoli, Lebanon. It was commissioned by the Ottoman governor of Tripoli Mahmud Lutfi al-Za'im and constructed in 1559 in the early time of Ottoman Syria under Suleiman the Magnificent. Its name means "hanging mosque" originating in the location of the mosque in the first floor of a structure partly roofing a street. Steps lead up to the entrance of the mosque. Above the door, a foundation inscription on stone is installed mentioning the completion of the mosque in Rabi' al-Awwal of AH 969 (November/December 1561). The mosque has an octagonal minaret that is decorated by two bands of black stone. The minaret is crowned by two levels having a balcony each, the eight windows of the lower balcony are roofed by pointed arches. Next to the mosque, there is a garden that can be reached by steps. The garden is the location of the Mausoleum of Mahmud Lutfi al-Za'im.

References

Mosques in Tripoli, Lebanon
Ottoman architecture in Lebanon
16th-century mosques